Ketevan "Keto" Losaberidze (1 August 1949 – 23 January 2022) was a Georgian archer.

Career
She competed for the Soviet Union at the 1972 and 1980 Olympics and won a gold medal in 1980, becoming the only Soviet Olympic champion in archery. She placed fourth in 1972. Between 1971 and 1981 she won two world, four European and two Soviet titles. She was chosen as the Georgian sportsman of the year 1980 and placed fourth in the vote for the Georgian sportswoman of the 20th century. After retiring from competitions she worked as a professor of mathematics at the Tbilisi State University and from 2002 to 2005 headed the Georgian Archery Federation. She died on 23 January 2022, at the age of 72.

References

1949 births
2022 deaths
People from Imereti
Archers at the 1972 Summer Olympics
Archers at the 1980 Summer Olympics
Olympic gold medalists for the Soviet Union
Olympic medalists in archery
Soviet female archers
Medalists at the 1980 Summer Olympics
World Archery Championships medalists
Recipients of the Presidential Order of Excellence